Mrs Mopp is a 1983 video game developed by Tina Billett for the ZX Spectrum. It was originally issued by Computasolve and later rereleased by Atlantis Software.

The player takes the role of a housewife trying to keep her kitchen tidy against the best mess-making efforts of her family. As time passes, dirt, cups, glasses and clothes accumulate on the floor, blocking her progress around the kitchen. Mrs Mopp must pick up one of the appropriately coloured tools around the room (basket, tray or dustpan and brush) and use it to collect the mess.  When the character sprite flashes, the tool must be emptied into the appropriate part of the kitchen (washing machine, sink, or bin).

When Mrs Mopp gets tired, she can revive herself by having a swig of sherry, but care must be taken not to drink too much, or Mrs Mopp will become first tipsy (reversed controls), then drunk (random movement).

Reception
69% Crash magazine (Issue 1)

References

External links 
 CRASH magazine review
 Spectrum $creens: loading screen and cassette cover 
 

1983 video games
Video games developed in the United Kingdom
ZX Spectrum games
ZX Spectrum-only games
Atlantis Software games
Single-player video games
Video games featuring female protagonists